Synechron Inc. is a New York-based information technology and consulting company focused on the financial services industry including capital markets, insurance, banking, cards & payments and digital.

History
Synechron was founded in 2001 by Faisal Husain, Zia Bhutta and Tanveer Saulat. In 2007, the company acquired 110 Technologies, a testing services company. Synechron acquired SysCore Solutions, a technology strategy and data architecture company, in 2008.

In 2012, Synechron opened offices in Houston, Texas and Plantation, Florida. Synechron acquired Esquire Systems, an IT consulting company, that same year. It acquired Double Effect, an Amsterdam and Singapore-based management consulting firm which would operate as an independent company, in April 2013.

In September 2013, Synechron partnered with software company Cloudera. In February 2014, the company opened a new facility in Pune, India, and an office in Dallas, Texas later that year. In April 2014, Synechron announced it would be expanding its presence in Bangalore, Chennai and Hyderabad.

Synechron announced the purchase of Team Trade, a Paris-based software integration and consulting firm, in January 2015. Team Trade continued to operate as an independent company after the acquisition. In August 2015, Synechron acquired usable, a digital design firm based in Brooklyn. In September 2015, Synechron acquired Crossbridge, a London-based financial services and consulting firm.

The company opened Synechron Digital Innovation Centre in Dubai in October 2015, as a centre of technology for clients interested in investing in technologies. Synechron rebranded in 2016 with the launch of its new website and new "Power of Three" strategy, covering digital, business and technology-based services. In May 2016, Synechron announced the acquisition of Hatstand, a global financial services consultancy that broadens Synechron's trading systems, data management, and risk and regulation practices.

The London Synechron Digital Innovation Centre opened at their London headquarters in May 2016. The centre holds full and half-day sessions as well as technology workshops. Synechron announced its collaboration with Ethereum's production studio ConsenSys and BlockApps, and launched its blockchain accelerator program in September 2016 with six modular applications.

Synechron released AI applications for financial services in April 2017 under the name Neo. In May 2017, Synechron partnered with Microsoft Azure and released its blockchain accelerator applications in the Azure marketplace. The company announced a collaboration with Quantexa to launch anti-money laundering, fraud detection and trader surveillance efforts in July 2017. That same month, the company also added its ninth FinLab, designed to promote digital innovation in financial technology, in Charlotte, N.C. In August 2017, the company released an open source utility tool for Enterprise Ethereum Alliance members to help developers create applications on the Quorum platform.

In November 2018, Synechron launched 11 AI data science accelerators for the banking, financial services and insurance (BFSI) sector  and a new financial innovation lab (FinLab) in Singapore.

Synechron announced the acquisition of Citihub Digital, a London and New York-based technology consulting firm on October 26, 2020. 

On 11 December 2021, Synechron acquired Attra, an Australia-based company.

Locations
Synechron is based in New York with additional offices throughout the US including Piscataway, Charlotte, Dallas, Irvine, Brentwood and Fort Lauderdale. The company is one of the largest independent pure-play technology consulting and outsourcing providers for the financial services industry with over 8,000 employees across 18 countries including USA, Canada, UK, France, The Netherlands, Switzerland, Luxembourg, Serbia, Hungary, Germany, Italy, UAE, Singapore, Hong Kong, Philippines, Japan, Australia, and India.

References

External links
 Personally Tech With Faisal Husain, Global CEO and Founder, Synechron NDTV (2014) 
 Future of UAE banking: talking ATMs, holographic cashiers The National (2015)
What it Takes to be a Successful Fintech Start-Up CNBC (2017)
 Fintech experts wanted, but not many people fit the bill by Tanveer Saulat, Synechron CPO
 How 'Noise' can help Businesses Close the Last Mile in Artificial Intelligence by Faisal Husain, CEO and Founder of Synechron

Information technology companies of the United States
Financial services companies established in 2001